Bill Ray Jackson (September 15, 1935 – January 17, 2022) was an American television personality, cartoonist, and educator. He was best known for having hosted the children's programs The BJ and Dirty Dragon Show and Gigglesnort Hotel.

Early life and career
Jackson was born in Unionville, Missouri. His father worked with a traveling carnival. He said he was very influenced by both comic strips and comic books, with Li'l Abner and Donald Duck being his favorites. Jackson graduated from the University of Missouri's school of journalism with a degree in television production in 1957, but did not get interested in puppetry until later.

His first broadcasting job was at KTVO in Ottumwa, Iowa, where he was a weatherman, copywriter and the station's art director. After a year at the station, Jackson joined the Army and was assigned to the Armed Forces Network in Hollywood. It was there that he created his first puppets.

His earliest appearance in children's television was in 1960 when he hosted a program in Fort Wayne, Indiana, called the Popeye and Little Rascals Club; this was broadcast for two years. The show was such a success that he moved on to Indianapolis for another three years with the Mickey Mouse Club on WLWI (now WTHR), later renamed The Bill Jackson Show, where he created his most enduring character, Dirty Dragon, based on a friend in Indianapolis. Jackson said "Cartoon Town" was based on the small town he grew up in and some of his puppet characters were based on some of his Unionville neighbors, and that the character "Weird" was based on a Chicago friend.

His work attracted the attention of WBBM-TV in Chicago, which gave him a program in 1965, known variously as Clown Alley (weekday version) or Here Comes Freckles (Sunday morning version). Unfortunately, in spite of wide critical praise, the show drew poor ratings, largely because it was broadcast early in the morning, and was cancelled after two seasons. Jackson played the title character, Freckles the Clown; although many of the puppet characters continued to appear on later series, Jackson usually played himself (or "B.J.", as his puppet co-stars called him) throughout the remainder of his career.

Chicago
Jackson's work did not go unnoticed, however, and he was hired by another Chicago station, the then-independent WFLD, which was looking for a show to go opposite WGN-TV's highly popular Garfield Goose and Friends. Jackson, a gifted artist, comedian and puppeteer, responded in 1968 with a program initially called Cartoon Town, but later renamed The BJ and Dirty Dragon Show. It was here that Jackson, playing the mayor of the cartoon town, reached great heights with characters such as Dirty Dragon, "Weird" and "Wally Goodscout", "Mother Plumtree", the "Old Professor", and a town monument called "Blob" which was made of clay and could, with Jackson's help, assume any form. Jackson wrote and produced the show, performed all of the puppet characters' voices, and built and designed the sets and puppets. The show featured a variety of cartoons, including Underdog, Popeye (the early 1960s made-for-TV King Features version), "Out of the Inkwell" (the made-for-TV version produced by Hal Seeger) and George of the Jungle. The show was broadcast for five years on WFLD, but ended after the station's owner, Field Communications, sold an interest to Kaiser Broadcasting, and Kaiser streamlined local productions on its group of stations. The final WFLD episode (#1311) was broadcast July 27, 1973; one month later, The BJ & Dirty Dragon Show (now set in "Carefree Corners") began a one-year run on WGN.

Meanwhile, Jackson began commuting between Chicago and New York, where he produced and hosted another local show, BJ's Bunch, featuring many of the same characters. By the fall of 1974, WGN cancelled The BJ & Dirty Dragon Show, after which Jackson produced a one-shot holiday special, A Gift For Granny, which aired on WMAQ-TV, Chicago's NBC affiliate.

Later career
Jackson and his puppets next appeared in the educationally themed program Gigglesnort Hotel in 1975, which brought most of the old Cartoon Town characters back, plus a few new creations. Produced and broadcast by WLS-TV, Chicago's ABC affiliate, the show was very popular with critics, though less so with the public, and ran for three seasons. Jackson said his influence for the show was Fawlty Towers. He made a final program called Firehouse Follies using the characters in 1979–1980, then left television to teach at California Institute of the Arts for the School of Film/Video for 12 years, retiring in 1990.

In a 2001 interview, Jackson expressed some frustration at seemingly not being able to fit into the criteria established for children's programming on network television. He said, "I am not "teachy" enough for PBS and am not considered worthy enough for Nickelodeon." By the end of its run, Gigglesnort Hotel was syndicated nationally, and reruns continued to air on WLS in Chicago through 1985. Several episodes were released by Karl-Lorimar Home Video in the 1980s in a series of six volumes, one of which consisted of two holiday specials Jackson produced in California after he left Chicago: Billy Joe's Thanksgiving --aka Salute To The Turkey-- and a later remake of A Gift For Granny, which featured a green incarnation of Dirty Dragon and a female voice artist as Mother Plumtree.

In later years, Jackson started a website to sell DVDs of his old programs online. He lived quietly in California with his wife, Jo. While his shows were on the air, Jackson received two Iris Awards for the best locally produced children's show in the United States, as well as local Emmys for the shows and his role in them.

In 2005, he became a member of the Chicago chapter of the National Academy of Television Arts and Sciences Silver Circle. Ten years earlier, he had donated all his original puppets to Chicago's Museum of Broadcast Communications.

In 2008, he published a memoir called The Only Kid on the Carnival. In 2009, he produced a documentary, Remembering Cartoon Town and B.J. & Dirty Dragon. Jackson said in an interview when the DVD was released that many of the Cartoon Town episodes were not preserved. Jackson also appeared for a presentation for the Museum of Broadcast Communications, "Saturday Morning with B.J. and Dirty Dragon: Bill Jackson, Live in Person—One Last Time", in December 2009. He indicated this would be his last time appearing as a performer.

Death
Jackson was hospitalized with COVID-19 shortly before his death, but was released. He died in Paso Robles, California, on January 17, 2022, at the age of 86. His official cause of death was not announced.

Citations

General bibliography

External links
 Bill Jackson's official website
 Thanks to TV Party.com for the information
 
 BJ & Dirty Dragon Photo Gallery—Chicago Tribune
 BJ & Dirty Dragon Show  various clips

1935 births
2022 deaths
American television personalities
Male television personalities
Military personnel from Missouri
People from Unionville, Missouri
University of Missouri alumni
Deaths from the COVID-19 pandemic in California